Dianajonesia is a genus of goose barnacles in the family Poecilasmatidae. The taxon is a replacement name for the previously used Temnaspis, which by precedence is now accorded to a genus of megalopodid beetles. The type species of the genus is D. fissum, originally described by Charles Darwin as Poecilasma fissa. The genus contains the following species:

Dianajonesia amygdalum (Aurivilius, 1894)
Dianajonesia bathynomi (Annandale, 1906)
Dianajonesia excavatum (Hoek, 1907)
Dianajonesia fissum (Darwin, 1851)
Dianajonesia kilepoae (Zevina, 1968)
Dianajonesia lenticula (Aurivilius, 1894)
Dianajonesia minutum (Gruvel, 1902)
Dianajonesia tridens (Aurivilius, 1894)
Dianajonesia vagans (Aurivilius, 1894)

References

Barnacles